Thomas George Nevakshonoff (born December 22, 1958) is a former politician in Manitoba, Canada.  He served as a member of the Manitoba legislature, prior to his defeat in 2016.

Nevakshonoff was born in Winnipeg, Manitoba. He grew up in Poplarfield and Fisher Branch, Manitoba.  He graduated from the Fisher Branch Collegiate Institute in 1977.  He then spent eighteen years working in Canada's oilfields.

In 1987, Nevakshonoff graduated from Carleton University in Ottawa with a Bachelor of Arts degree in East European Studies. He is from a Doukhobor family that moved to Canada in 1899. Nevakshonoff travelled to Russia in 1991 where he was employed by Canadian companies interested in the Russian oil and gas industries. In 1992, he was commissioned by the Canadian Embassy in Russia to write a petroleum sector study.

He returned to Canada and on his father's retirement replaced his father as co-owner of the family  business, Aberdeen Lodge, a family-owned lodge located just south of Flin Flon. He married Rozanne Imlah in 2000.

Nevakshonoff was elected to the Manitoba legislature as a New Democrat in the provincial election of 1999, defeating Progressive Conservative Betty Green by 3809 votes to 3260 in the riding of Interlake.

In 2003, he supported Bill Blaikie's campaign to become leader of the federal New Democratic Party.

Nevakshonoff was re-elected in the 2003 election, defeating Betty Green again by a wider margin. He was returned again in the 2007 election. He is the chair of the NDP's Legislative Review Committee of the NDP Caucus and  the Standing Committee of Agriculture of the Legislative Assembly.  He is also the  Legislative Assistant to the Minister of Conservation and the Minister of Infrastructure and Transportation. In 2011, he was named deputy speaker. Nevakshonoff was elected again in 2011.

His great-grandfather Henry Mabb and Frederick Bird, another ancestor, both served in the Manitoba assembly.

References

1958 births
Canadian people of Russian descent
Carleton University alumni
Living people
New Democratic Party of Manitoba MLAs
Politicians from Winnipeg
Members of the Executive Council of Manitoba
21st-century Canadian politicians